A Midsummer's Fantasia is a 2014 Korea-Japan co-production film commissioned by the Nara International Film Festival (NIFF). Written and directed by Jang Kun-jae, the film was co-produced with world-renowned filmmaker Naomi Kawase. It made its debut as the opening film of the 5th Nara International Film Festival in September 2014.

Plot
The film is structured into two halves. Part one First Love, Yoshiko, shot in monochrome and documentary-like, deals with a Korean filmmaker researching to shoot a film in Gojo City, Japan. While Part two Well of Sakura, in colour, tells a tale of romance between a Korean actress and a Japanese man from the area inspired by the research from Part one.

Cast
 Kim Sae-byuk as Hye-jeong  
 Iwase Ryo   
 Lim Hyung-kook

Production
A Midsummer's Fantasia is a film commission for the Nara International Film Festival (NIFF). The NARAtive is a project to make an original film in Nara prefecture, funded by NIFF.

It was shot in Gojo, a small city in the Nara prefecture, for 11 days during a monthlong stay.

Reception

Awards and nominations

References

External links 
 
 
 

2014 films
2010s Korean-language films
South Korean romantic drama films
Films set in Japan
Japan in non-Japanese culture
2010s South Korean films